René Goris (born 1 February 1946) is a Belgian long-distance runner. He competed in the men's 5000 metres at the 1972 Summer Olympics held in Munich, West Germany.

In 1970, he competed in the men's 5000 metres event at the 1970 Summer Universiade held in Turin, Italy.

References

1946 births
Living people
Athletes (track and field) at the 1972 Summer Olympics
Belgian male long-distance runners
Olympic athletes of Belgium
Place of birth missing (living people)
Competitors at the 1970 Summer Universiade
20th-century Belgian people